Sundara Karma are an English rock band formed in 2011 in Reading, England. The band consists of lead vocalist, guitarist and songwriter Oscar Pollock, lead guitarist Ally Baty, bassist Dom Cordell and drummer Haydn Evans. The band's name is derived from Sanskrit words, meaning "Beautiful Karma".

History

2011–2016: Formation and early years  
Sundara Karma formed in 2011 while they were teenagers in secondary school. In 2013, after uploading an early demo to SoundCloud, the band were offered to be the opening support for several major acts. The next three years saw the band touring relentlessly across the United Kingdom and Europe while also putting out music that would later feature on their debut album, Youth Is Only Ever Fun in Retrospect.

2017–2018: Youth is Only Ever Fun In Retrospect 
In January 2017, Sundara Karma released their debut album  titled Youth Is Only Ever Fun in Retrospect via Sony Music and Chess Club. It peaked at number 24 on the UK Albums Chart and received Silver Certification from British Phonographic Industry. In May 2017, they announced an upgrade to their debut album via social media, adding the tracks "Explore", "Lakhey", and "Another Word For Beautiful" to the original track listing.

2019–2020: Ulfilas' Alphabet and Kill Me
On 1 March 2019, Sundara Karma released their second studio album, Ulfilas' Alphabet, under RCA Records. Ulfilas' Alphabet was produced by Stuart Price and Alex Robertshaw. The album peaked at number 28 on the UK Albums Chart. Ulfilas' Alphabet received positive reviews from The Guardian, NME, Dork , DIY and others.

In May 2020, the band shared three singles titled "Today, Tomorrow, Yesterday", "Invade Safe Space" and "Vision Sick" via SoundCloud. These were unreleased songs from the recording of their 2019 album Ulfilas’ Alphabet.

On 1 October 2020, Sundara Karma released their single "Kill Me" via Chess Club Records.

On 24 October 2020, they released their EP "Kill Me" consisting of 5 songs, including the song of the same name released at the start of the month.

2021–present: Oblivion!

On 17 September 2021, nearly a year after their fourth EP, the band premiered the single "Godsend". In February 2022, it was followed by the release of the title track off their fifth EP, Oblivion!. The EP was released on 1 April 2022.

Members
Oscar Pollock – vocals, rhythm and acoustic guitar, piano, keyboard, synthesizer (2011–present)
Dom Cordell – bass, backing vocals (2011–present)
Ally Baty – guitar, keyboard, synthesizers, backing vocals (2011–present)
Haydn Evans – drums (2011–present)

Discography

Studio albums

EPs

Singles

References

English rock music groups
English indie rock groups
Musical groups established in 2011
Musical groups from Reading, Berkshire
Musical quartets
RCA Records artists
2011 establishments in England